The following outline is provided as an overview of and topical guide to library science:

Library and information science (LIS) is the scientific study of issues related to libraries and the information fields. This includes academic studies regarding how library resources are used and how people interact with library systems. The organization of knowledge for efficient retrieval of relevant information is also a major research goal of library science.  Being interdisciplinary, it overlaps with computer science, various social sciences, statistics, and systems analysis.

Nature of library and information science

Definition 
Library and information science can be described as all of the following: 

 The study of libraries and information both in terms of theory and practice. 
 Field of science – widely recognized category of specialized expertise within science, and typically embodies its own terminology and nomenclature. Such a field will usually be represented by one or more scientific journals, where peer reviewed research is published. There are many library and information-related scientific journals.
 Social science – field of academic scholarship that explores aspects of human society.

Essence 

 Library and information science
 Library science
 Information science

 Glossary of library and information science
 Cataloging
 Classification
 Information architecture
 Librarian
 Library

Branches of library and information science
 Archival science
 Bibliographic databases
 Cataloging
 Library instruction
 Preservation
 Readers' advisory
 Reference

Types of library and information professionals 

 Librarian
 Application specialist – see integrated library system
 Cataloguing librarian – see library catalog
 Collections librarian – see library collection development
 Electronic resources librarian – see electronic resource management
 Law librarian – expert in legal research
 Metadata librarian – see metadata
 Reference librarian –  helps patrons with research
 Research instruction librarian – see library instruction
 Teacher-librarian
 Archivist
 Curator
 Indexer
 Information architect
 Information consultant (may be a qualified librarian)
 Prospect researcher
 Records manager (see Records management)

History of library and information science

History of library science
 History of Information Science
 List of larger libraries in the ancient world

Types of libraries

 Academic library
 Archive
 Digital library
 National library
 List of national libraries
 Public library
 Carnegie library
 Research library
 School library
 Special library

Specific libraries 

 List of libraries

Library and information resources
Document

Information media
 Audiobook
 Bibliographic database
 Book
 List of books
 Bookmark
 Braille book
 CD-ROM
 Codex
 Compact audio cassette
 Compact disc
 DVD
 Ebook
 Film Stock
 Gramophone record
 Information architecture
 Laserdisc
 Magnetic tape
 Manuscript
 Map
 Microfiche
 Microfilm
 Microprint
 Newsgroup
 Newspaper
 Pamphlet
 Phonograph cylinder
 Photograph
 Scroll (parchment)
 Sheet music
 Slide library
 Videotape
 Web site
 Wire recording

Types of publications
 Academic journal
 Almanac
 List of almanacs
 Atlas
 Comic book
 Dictionary
 Encyclopedia
 Lists of encyclopedias
 Gazetteer
 Graphic novel
 Lexicon
 Magazine
 Newspaper
 Specific newspapers
 Reference work
 Serial
 Series of books
 Telephone directory
 Thesaurus

Catalogs and indexes
 AACR2
 Accession number
 Authority control
 Bliss bibliographic classification
 Classification
 Collation
 Colon classification
 Colophon
 Dewey Decimal Classification
 Controlled vocabulary
 Index
 International Standard Bibliographic Description
 Library catalog
 Library of Congress Classification
 Machine Readable Cataloging
 NUCMC
 OCLC
 OPAC
 Resource Description and Access
 Subject
 Universal Decimal Classification
 WorldCat

Information science 

 Glossary of information science terms
 Human-computer interaction
 Integrated library system
 Evidence-based library and information practice

Organization of information 

 Cataloging and classification
List of Catalogs and indexes
 Subject indexing
 Taxonomic classification
 Scientific classification
 Statistical classification
 Security classification
 Film classification
 Categorization
 Data modeling
 Knowledge management/ Knowledge engineering
 Information architecture
 Information system

Electronic information storage and retrieval

 Data storage
 Boolean expression
 Computer storage
 Data management
 Data storage device
 Database
 Digital library
 Document management
 Expert system
 Fuzzy logic
 Geographic Information System
 Invisible web
 Keyword
 Knowledge management
 Memory
 Metadata
 OpenURL
 Precision
 Recall
 Semantic web
 XML
 Information retrieval
 Controlled vocabulary
 Cross-language information retrieval
 Digital libraries
 Document classification
 Educational psychology
 Federated search
 Full text search
 Geographic information system
 Information extraction
 Information seeking
 Knowledge visualization
 Question answering
 Search engines
 Search index
 tf-idf

Infometrics 

 Bibliometrics – studies quantitative aspects of recorded information
 Webometrics – studies quantitative aspects of the World Wide Web
 Cybermetrics – similar to webometrics, but broadens its definition to include electronic resources

Scientometrics 

Scientometrics – studies quantitative aspects of science
 Bradford's law
 Citation
 Data mining
 Impact factor
 Information retrieval
 Peer review
 Web mining

Informatics 

Informatics
 Bioinformatics
 Biodiversity Informatics
 Biomedical informatics
 Business Informatics
 Ecoinformatics
 Cheminformatics
 Community informatics
 Geoinformatics
 Health informatics
 Laboratory informatics
 Neuroinformatics
 Social informatics

Information and society 

 Information society
 Censorship
 Copyright
 Freedom of Information Act
 Information access
 Intellectual freedom
 Intellectual property
 Literacy
 USA PATRIOT Act
 Open source
 Privacy
 Cultural studies
 Technological determinism
 Groupware
 Human-computer interaction
 Information ethics
 Usability engineering/ User-centered design

Library operations and management 

Library management –
 Five laws of library science
 Information
 Information literacy
 Knowledge management

Research methods 
 Bibliography
 Digital reference services
 Genealogy
 Reference works
 Library reference desk
 Reference interview
 Research

Organizing and searching Wikipedia 
 Wikipedia resources for researchers
 Wikipedia:Categorization
 Wikipedia:Citing Wikipedia
 Wikipedia:Common words, searching for which is not possible
 Wikipedia:How to explore Wikipedia
 Wikipedia:Naming conventions (and its subpages)
 Wikipedia:Searching
 Wikipedia:WikiProject Fact and Reference Check

Selection and acquisition of library materials
 Children's literature
 Information explosion
 ISBN
 ISSN
 Library acquisitions
 Library collection development
 Literature
 Public Lending Right
 Young adult literature

Preservation

Preservation
 Archival science
 Archive
 Archivist
 Art conservation and restoration
 Conservation
 Curator
 Digital preservation
 Film preservation
 Historic preservation
 Library binding
 Mass deacidification
 Preservationist
 Slow fire

Other library services and processes 
 Bookmobile
 Interlibrary loan
 Library circulation
 Library portal
 Library technical services
 RFID
 Reference management software

Politics of library science 

 Government information
 REFORMA

Legal issues 
 Censorship
 Copyright
 Intellectual freedom
 Intellectual property
 Intellectual property rights
 Intellectual freedom
 Legal deposit
 Library Bill of Rights
 Open access (publishing)
 Public lending right
 Serials crisis

Laws 
 Children's Internet Protection Act
 Digital Millennium Copyright Act
 Freedom of Information Act
 Patriot Act
 USA PATRIOT Act

Legal precedents 
 New York Times Company v. Tasini

Social issues 

 Decreased funding for established libraries
 Digital divide
 Digitization
 Education for librarianship
 Information access
 Information and communication technologies (ICT's)
 Sustainability and ICT's
 Information explosion
 Information policy
 Information literacy
 Information Society
 Literacy
 Remote access

Education and training 

Education for librarianship –
List of I-Schools

Academic courses in library science
 Collection management
 Cataloging and classification
 Database management
 Information architecture
 Information systems and technology
 Knowledge management
 List of Library Science schools
 Management
 Preservation
 Reference
 Research methods
 Statistics

Professional organizations

 American Association of School Librarians
 American Library Association
 Australian Library and Information Association
 Canadian Library Association
 Association for Library Service to Children
 Association of Research Libraries
 International Federation of Library Associations (IFLA)
 Public Library Association
 Special Libraries Association

Non-Profit organizations
 Librarians Without Borders
 Bibliothèques Sans Frontières
 African Library Project
 Friends of Libraries

Notable people in library science
 List of librarians
 Librarians in popular culture
 Sanford Berman
 Daniel J. Boorstin
 William Warner Bishop
 Lee Pierce Butler
 John Cotton Dana
 Melvil Dewey
 John Fiske (philosopher)
 Michael Gorman
 Seymour Lubetzky
 Eric Moon
 Paul Evan Peters
 S. R. Ranganathan
 Jesse Shera
 Howard D. White

See also

Wikipedia:WikiProject Libraries
:Category:Library science journals
:Category:Library science magazines
Wikiproject BID (library, information, documentation) at the German Wikipedia
Portail SID (information literacy and libraries) at the French Wikipedia.
How to find a book on Wikibooks
 Document management system
 Grey literature
 History of Public Library Advocacy
 Informatics
 Library of Congress
 Library anxiety
 OCLC
 Preservation: Library and Archival Science
 Public Library Advocacy
 Serials, periodicals and journals
 The works of Michael Gorman

External links

 Visualizing Library and Information Science from the practitioner's perspective
 LISNews.org Librarian and Information Science News
 LISWire.com Librarian and Information Science Wire

History
 Jefferson's Library - Exhibition including a sample page from "Catalog of Library of Thomas Jefferson"
 Chronology of information science and technology - From the 17th to the 20th century
 Chronology of chemical information science
 Information science pioneers - Biographies of pioneers and famous information scientists

Library and information science
Library and information science
 
Library and information science topics
Science-related lists